The men's épée was a fencing event held as part of the Fencing at the 1912 Summer Olympics programme. It was the fourth appearance of the event, which had been introduced in 1900. The competition was held from 11 to 13 July at the Östermalm Athletic Grounds. There were 93 competitors from 15 nations. Each nation could enter up to 12 fencers. The event was won by Paul Anspach of Belgium. His countryman Philippe le Hardy took bronze. Silver went to Denmark's Ivan Joseph Martin Osiier, the only medal won by the perennial Olympian who competed in seven Games over 40 years. The medals were the first in the men's épée for both nations.

Background

This was the fourth appearance of the event, which was not held at the first Games in 1896 (with only foil and sabre events held) but has been held at every Summer Olympics since 1900.

Three of the eight finalists from the 1908 Games returned: fourth-place finisher Robert Montgomerie of Great Britain, fifth-place finisher Paul Anspach of Belgium, and eighth-place finisher Martin Holt of Great Britain. 1904 bronze medalist Albertson Van Zo Post (this time correctly recognized as American rather than Cuban) also returned. The event was heavily impacted by boycotts by two of the top fencing nations over rules disputes. A dispute over the target area for foil fencing resulted in France initially boycotting the foil events and, at the last minute, expanding the boycott to all fencing events. A dispute over the maximum length of the épée blade resulted in Italy boycotting the épée events (though Italy did compete in other fencing events). These disputes would result in the creation of the Fédération Internationale d'Escrime to establish a governing body for the sport. 

Austria, Greece, Portugal, and the Russian Empire each made their debut in the event. Belgium, Germany, Great Britain, and the United States each appeared for the third time, tied for most among nations.

Competition format

The competition was held over four rounds. In each round, each pool held a round-robin, with bouts to 1 touch. Double-touches counted as touches against both fencers. Rather than hold separate barrages to separate fencers tied in the advancement spot (as had been done in 1908), the head-to-head results of bouts already fenced were used.

 First round: 16 pools of between 3 and 8 fencers each. The 3 fencers in each pool with the fewest touches against advanced to the quarterfinals. This resulted in some pools where all fencers received a bye.
 Second round: 8 pools of 6 fencers each. The 3 fencers in each pool with the fewest touches against advanced to the semifinals. 
 Semifinals: 4 pools of 6 fencers each. The 2 fencers in each pool with the fewest touches against advanced to the final.
 Final: 1 pool of 8 fencers.

Schedule

Results

Round 1

Pool A

Pool B

Pool C

Pool D

Pool E

Pool F

Pool G

Pool H

Pool I

Pool J

Pool K

Pool L

Pool M

Pool N

Pool O

Pool P

Quarterfinals

Quarterfinal A

Quarterfinal B

Quarterfinal C

Quarterfinal D

Quarterfinal E

Quarterfinal F

Quarterfinal G

Quarterfinal H

Semifinals

Semifinal A

Semifinal B

Semifinal C

Semifinal D

Final

Three of Holt's matches were double-losses: those against le Hardy, Boin, and Seligman.

Results summary

References

 
 

Fencing at the 1912 Summer Olympics